The Rhodes House is a historic house in Brighton, Tennessee, U.S.. It was built in 1860 for Soloman A. Rhodes, a planter who inherited the land from his parents. Rhodes was married twice, and he had ten children. He owned 18 slaves in 1860.

It was the main house of a large plantation.  A servants house is another contributing building on the property;  there are also non-contributing dependencies.

The house is two stories, with a one-story ell, and is basically Greek Revival in style. It has been listed on the National Register of Historic Places since April 30, 1980.

References

National Register of Historic Places in Tipton County, Tennessee
Greek Revival architecture in Tennessee
Houses completed in 1860
Plantations in Tennessee